Web annotation refers to 
 online annotations of web resources (web annotation) such as web pages or parts of them, and
 a set of W3C standards (Web Annotation) developed for this purpose.

Note that the term web annotation can also be understood in the sense of doing annotations on the web and it has been used in this sense for the annotation tool WebAnno, now INCEpTION. However, this is a general feature of many modern tools for annotation in natural language processing or in the philologies and not discussed here. For Web-based text annotation systems, see Text annotation.

Annotation of web resources 

With a web annotation system, a user can add, modify or remove information from a Web resource without modifying the resource itself. The annotations can be thought of as a layer on top of the existing resource, and this annotation layer is usually visible to other users who share the same annotation system. In such cases, the web annotation tool is a type of social software tool. For Web-based text annotation systems, see Text annotation.

Web annotation can be used for the following purposes:

 to rate a Web resource, such as by its usefulness, user-friendliness, suitability for viewing by minors.
 to improve or adapt its contents by adding/removing material (like wiki).
 as a collaborative tool, e.g. to discuss the contents of a certain resource.
 as a medium of artistic or social criticism, by allowing Web users to reinterpret, enrich or protest against institution or ideas that appear on the Web.
 to quantify transient relationships between information fragments.
to save, retain and synthesize selected information.

Annotations can be considered an additional layer with respect to comments.  Comments are published by the same publisher who hosts the original document.  Annotations are added on top of that, but may eventually become comments which, in turn, may be integrated in a further version of the document itself.

Comparison of web annotation systems
Many of these systems require software to be installed to enable some or all of the features below. This fact is only noted in footnotes if the software that is required is additional software provided by a third party.

Discontinued web annotation systems

Web Annotation standard 

In the Web Annotation standard,

The basic data structures of Web Annotation (Fig. 1) are 
 target (the element being annotated, e.g., a web document or a part of it),
 body (the content of the annotation, e.g., a string value), and
 annotation (the element that serves to relate body and target of an annotation)

The body can be a literal value or structured content (a URI). The target can be identified by an URI (e.g., fragment identifiers) and/or a selector that defines a domain-, resource- or application-specific access protocol, e.g., offset-based, XPath-based, etc.

Web Annotation was standardized on February 23, 2017 with the release of three official Recommendations by the W3C Web Annotation Working Group:

    Web Annotation Data Model
    Web Annotation Vocabulary
    Web Annotation Protocol

These recommendations were accompanied by additional working group notes that describe their application:

    Embedding Web Annotations in HTML
    Selectors and States

The Web Annotation data model is also provided in machine-readable form as the Web Annotation ontology.
Note that this ontology defines the Web Annotation namespace (https://www.w3.org/ns/oa#), and that this namespace is conventionally abbreviated as oa. This is the abbreviation for Open Annotation, a W3C Community Group whose specifications formed the basis for the Web Annotation standard.

Web Annotation supersedes other standardization initiatives for annotations on the web within the W3C.

Related specifications 

Web Annotation can be used in conjunction with (or as an alternative to) fragment identifiers that describe how to address elements within a web document by means of URIs. These include

 RFC 5147 (URI fragment identifiers for the text/plain media type)
 RFC 7111 (URI fragment identifiers for the text/csv media type)
 RFC 8118 (URI fragment identifiers for the application/pdf media type)
 SVG fragment identifiers
 XPointer (for addressing components of XML documents)
 Media Fragments (for addressing components of media files)

Other, non-standardized fragment identifiers are in use, as well, e.g., within the NLP Interchange Format.

Independently from Web Annotation, more specialized data models for representing annotations on the web have been developed, e.g., the NLP Interchange Format (NIF) for applications in language technology. In early 2020, the W3C Community Group `Linked Data for Language Technology´ has launched an initiative to harmonize these vocabularies and to develop a consolidated RDF vocabulary for linguistic annotations on the web.

See also 
 Comparison of notetaking software
 Social bookmarking
 Some reference management software packages also support web annotations
 Backlinks
 Online deliberation
 Folksonomy
 Metadata
 Threaded discussion
 Virtual graffiti
 Comparison of software saving Web pages for offline use

References

Further reading 
 
 Signer, Beat: "An Architecture for Open Cross-Media Annotation Services", Proceedings of WISE 2009, 10th International Conference on Web Information Systems Engineering, Poznan, Poland, October 2009
 On Web Annotations: Promises and Pitfalls of Current Web Infrastructure. Venu Vasudevan and Mark Palmer, Proceedings of the 32nd Hawaii International Conference on System Sciences - 1999
 A Survey of Web Annotation Systems. Rachel M. Heck, Sarah M. Luebke, Chad H. Obermark. 1999.
 New ways of using Web annotations. Laurent Denoue, Laurence Vignollet.
 Ricardo Kawase, George Papadakis, Eelco Herder, Wolfgang Nejdl: The impact of bookmarks and annotations on refinding information. ACM Hypertext Conference 2010: 29-34
 Ricardo Kawase, Eelco Herder, George Papadakis, Wolfgang Nejdl: In-Context Annotations for Refinding and Sharing. Webist (Selected Papers) 2010: 85-100

External links
 W3C Web Annotation Working Group Recommendations (as of February 23, 2017):
 Web Annotation Data Model
 Web Annotation Vocabulary
 Web Annotation Protocol
 Web Annotation Architecture, W3C's interactive illustration

 
Web annotation
Web software